Hans Kotzsch (24 April 1901, Dresden (Loschwitz) - 25 July 1950  Dresden (Blasewitz)) was a German entomologist who specialised in Lepidoptera.

From 1925 Kotzsch owned the entomological dealership "Hermann Wernicke" in Dresden. From here he sold insects collected on his many collecting trips (Rybachy Peninsula (1933), Armenia (1934), Hindu Kush (1936), Iran and Afghanistan (1939) Turkey and China. Many of his specimens are in  Museum Alexander Koenig in  Bonn and in Museum für Naturkunde Berlin.
In 1948 two years before his death he purchased the business collection "Staudinger" - Bang-Haas from the widow of Otto Bang-Haas. Like most dealers of his time Kotzsch described many new subspecies of "exotic" butterflies, particularly from South America. Most are these are unsound but his taxonomic work on Palaearctic fauna is much better.

Works
Beginning list
 1929 Nue Falter aus dem Richthofengebirge Entomologische Zeitschrift 43 (16): 204-206, fig. 1-10.
 1936 Ein Sommer unter den Kurden. Ent. Rundsch. 53: 313-317 
 1939 Neue Weibform von Baronia brevicornis Salv.  Entomologische Zeitschrift  53(46):360. 
 1936. Falternenbreiten aus meiner Hindukusch-Expedition  Entomologische Rundschau. Bd. 54.5. S. 50–52.
 1939. Weitere Falterneuheiten aus meiner Hindukusch-Expedition 1936 Entomologische Rundschau 55 (1): 9-10.

References
Frickinger, H. W. 1950 Zum Tode von Hans Kotzsch. Anz. Schädlingsk. 
Hesselbart, G.; Oorschot, H. van & Wagener, S. 1995 Die Tagfalter der Türkei unter Berücksichtigung der angrenzenden Länder.  Bocholt, Selbstverlag S. Wagener 1-3 1-754; 758-1354; 1-847, 141 Taf.(z.T. farbig); 342 Karten 1179-1199
Holik, O. 1950: Hans Kotzsch. Ent. Z. 60 97-99. 
Pfaff, G. & Wrede, O. H. 1934 [Kotzsch, H.]  Festschrift, 50jähriges Bestehen I.E.V.  8, Portr. DEI.
Ryszka, H. 1950: Hans Kotzsch Ent. Nachrichtenblatt Österr. Schweiz. Ent. 2 79-8

1901 births
1950 deaths
German lepidopterists
20th-century German zoologists